The 2019 Berkeley Tennis Club Challenge was a professional tennis tournament played on outdoor hard courts. It was the second edition of the tournament which was part of the 2019 ITF Women's World Tennis Tour. It took place in Berkeley, California, United States between 15 and 21 July 2019.

Singles main-draw entrants

Seeds

 1 Rankings are as of 1 July 2019.

Other entrants
The following players received wildcards into the singles main draw:
  Kayla Day
  Maegan Manasse
  Natasha Subhash
  Katie Volynets

The following players received entry from the qualifying draw:
  Hanna Chang
  Victoria Duval
  Connie Ma
  Tara Moore
  Abbie Myers
  Junri Namigata
  Giuliana Olmos
  Alycia Parks

The following player received entry as a lucky loser:
  You Xiaodi

Champions

Singles

 Madison Brengle def.  Mayo Hibi, 7–5, 6–4

Doubles

 Madison Brengle /  Sachia Vickery def.  Francesca Di Lorenzo /  Katie Swan, 6–3, 7–5

References

External links
 2019 Berkeley Tennis Club Challenge at ITFtennis.com
 Official website

2019 ITF Women's World Tennis Tour
2019 in American tennis
Tennis tournaments in California